

Players

Competitions

Division Four

League table

League position by match

Matches

FA Cup

League Cup

Appearances and goals

References

Books

1960-61
Northampton Town